Giovanni Angelo Pellegrini (died 1568) was a Roman Catholic prelate who served as Bishop of Gravina di Puglia (1552–1568) and Bishop of Fondi (1537–1552).

Biography
On 14 March 1537, Giovanni Angelo Pellegrini was appointed during the papacy of Pope Paul III as Bishop of Fondi.
On 14 December 1552, he was appointed during the papacy of Pope Julius III as Bishop of Gravina di Puglia.
He served as Bishop of Gravina di Puglia until his death in 1568.

While bishop, he was the principal co-consecrator of James Beaton, Archbishop of Glasgow (1552).

References

External links and additional sources
 (for Chronology of Bishops) 
 (for Chronology of Bishops) 

16th-century Italian Roman Catholic bishops
Bishops appointed by Pope Paul III
Bishops appointed by Pope Julius III
1568 deaths